Michele Siano (born 9 April 1991, in Capaccio Scalo) is an Italian football midfielder who currently plays for ASD San Luca.

Career
In December 2019, Siano joined Eccellenza club ASD San Luca.

See also
Football in Italy
List of football clubs in Italy

References

External links
 aic.football.it 
 
 
 

Living people
1991 births
Italian footballers
Association football midfielders
Cavese 1919 players
Aurora Pro Patria 1919 players
U.S.D. Sestri Levante 1919 players
U.S. Agropoli 1921 players
Serie C players
Serie D players
Eccellenza players
U.S. Castrovillari Calcio players